Maarten Baas (born 19 February 1978) is a Dutch furniture designer. He is known for his Real Time series of clocks in which people paint the time by hand.

His career path was influenced by mentors like Jurgen Bey, colleagues like Bertjan Pot, and artists like Erwin Wurm.

References

External links
 

1978 births
Living people
Dutch designers
Dutch furniture designers
Dutch industrial designers
Polytechnic University of Milan alumni
Design Academy Eindhoven alumni